Bolzoni is an Italian surname. Notable people with the surname include:
 Adriano Bolzoni (1919–2003), Italian journalist, writer and film director
 Francesco Bolzoni (born 1989), Italian footballer

 Nino Bolzoni (1903–1972), Italian rower

Italian-language surnames